Avner Dorman (Hebrew: אבנר דורמן; born April 14, 1975 in Tel Aviv, Israel) is an Israeli-born composer, educator and conductor.

Education 
Dorman holds a doctorate in music composition from the Juilliard School, where he studied as a C.V. Starr fellow with John Corigliano. He completed his master's degree at the Buchmann-Mehta School of Music of Tel Aviv University (where he majored in music, musicology, and physics) studying with Josef Bardanashvili.

Career 
At age 25, Dorman became the youngest composer to win Israel's Prime-Minister's award. He has since been awarded the ACUM prize for his Ellef Symphony. Ma'ariv newspaper in Israel named Dorman "Composer of the Year" for 2002, and the performance of his song cycle "Boaz" received the Israeli Cultural Ministry Prize for best performance of Israeli music the same year. Dorman's "Variations Without a Theme", premiered by Zubin Mehta and the Israel Philharmonic Orchestra in November 2003 and won the 2004 Best Composition of the Year award from ACUM. This piece led to a commission from Zubin Mehta, PercaDu, and the Israel Philharmonic Orchestra for "Spices, Perfumes, Toxins!", a concerto for percussion duo and orchestra.

Orchestras that have performed Dorman's music include the Chicago Symphony Orchestra, New York Philharmonic Orchestra, the Los Angeles Philharmonic Orchestra, San Francisco Symphony, the Munich Philharmonic Orchestra, the Israel Philharmonic Orchestra and the Vienna Radio Symphony Orchestra.

In 2006, Naxos Records released an album dedicated to Dorman's piano works with Eliran Avni at the piano. In 2010, Naxos Records released an album dedicated to Dorman's chamber orchestra concerti. Avi Avital's performance of Dorman's "Mandolin Concerto" on this recording was nominated for a 2010 Grammy Award in the category of Best Instrumental Soloist Performance with Orchestra.

Dorman's debut opera, Wahnfried, was named as a finalist for the 2018 International Opera Awards, in the category of "World Premiere". He was awarded the 2018 Azrieli Prize for Jewish Music for his violin concerto, Nigunim, originally written as a violin sonata for violinist Gil Shaham and pianist Orli Shaham.

Dorman is an associate professor of theory and composition at the Sunderman Conservatory of Music at Gettysburg College. He served as music director of CityMusic Cleveland chamber orchestra from 2013 to 2019.

Compositions

Opera 
Wahnfried (2016)
Die Kinder des Sultans (2019)
Kundry (2021)

Percussion concertos 
Spices, Perfumes, Toxins! (2006)
Frozen in Time (2007)
Eternal Rhythm (2018)

Orchestral works without soloists 
Chorale for Strings (1999)
Ellef Symphony (2000)
Variations Without A Theme (2003)
Uriah (2008–9)
Azerbaijani Dance (2010)
(not) The Shadow (2010)
Astrolatry (2011)
After Brahms (2015)
Siklòn (2015)
A Most Sacred Oath (2021)

Large Wind Ensemble 
Ellef Symphony
Spices, Perfumes, Toxins!
A Most Sacred Oath (2021)

Works for narrator and orchestra 
Uzu and Zuzu from Kakaruzu (2012)

Choral works (with or without orchestra) 
Psalm 67 (2004)
Letters from Gettysburg (2013)
Dialogues of Love (2014)
The Seventy Names of Jerusalem (2015)

Violin concertos 
Violin Concerto no. 1 (2006)
Violin Concerto no. 2 – "Nigunim" (2017)
Violin Concerto no. 3 – "Still" (2019)

Piano concertos 
Piano Concerto in A (1995)
Piano Concerto no.2 – "Lost Souls" (2009)
Piano Concerto no.3 (2021)

Concertos for various instruments 

Piccolo Concerto (2001)
Concerto Grosso (2003)
Saxophone Concerto (2003)
Mandolin Concerto (2006)
Cello Concerto (2013)
Double Concerto (2019)

Sonatas for violin and piano 
Sonata No.1 (2004)
Sonata No.2 (2008)
Sonata No.3 – "Nigunim" (2011)
Sonata No.4 (2014)

Piano trios 
Tree-yO! (1996)
Trio (2001)

String quartets 
String Quartet No.1 (2003)
String Quartet No.2 (2004)
Prayer for the Innocents (2009)

Other chamber pieces 
Udacrep Akubrad (2001)
Boaz (2002)
Jerusalem Mix (2007)
Memory Games (2011)
The Fear of Men (2006)
Mantra (2013)
Consumed (2014)
Suite for Solo Saxophone (2015)
How to Love (2016)
Variations on a Simple Theme (2017)
For Solo Violin (2017)

Piano sonatas 
Sonata no.1 (1999)
Sonata no.2 (2000)
Sonata no.3 – "Dance Suite" (2005)
Sonata no.4 – "Libi Bamizrach" (2011)
Sonata no.5 (2018)
Sonata no.6 (2020)

Other solo piano music 
Prelude No.1 (1992)
Moments Musicaux (2003)
Azerbaijani Dance (2005)
Octurne Insomniaque (2007)
Karsilama for Two Pianos (2012)
Three Etudes (2012)
After Brahms (2014)
For a Friend I Never Knew (2017)

Short opera 
Boundless (2018)
Now (2018)

Music for film 
Wonderland (2013), directed by Avi Nesher
Past Life (2016), directed by Avi Nesher

Music for dance 
Ben (1997)
Accord/Discord (1999)
Falafel (2001)
Impact (2006)

References

External links 
 
Avner Dorman biography at G. Schirmer
Information about Avner Dorman on the New York Philharmonic Website

1975 births
Living people
20th-century classical composers
21st-century classical composers
Israeli composers
Israeli classical musicians
Jewish classical musicians
Israeli Jews
People from Tel Aviv
Juilliard School alumni
Tel Aviv University alumni
Gettysburg College faculty
Male classical composers
20th-century male musicians
21st-century male musicians
Adi Lautman Interdisciplinary Program for Outstanding Students alumni